The Italian Barber is a 1911 short silent drama film directed by D. W. Griffith, starring Joseph Graybill and featuring Mary Pickford. The film, by the Biograph Company, was shot in Fort Lee, New Jersey when many early film studios in America's first motion picture industry were based there at the beginning of the 20th century.

Cast
 Joseph Graybill - Tony
 Mary Pickford - Alice
 Marion Sunshine - Florence
 Mack Sennett - Bobby Mack
 Kate Bruce - Mother
 Robert Harron - man buying papers
 John T. Dillon - man buying papers
 W. C. Robinson - in shop
 Donald Crisp - at ball
 Adolph Lestina
 Vivian Prescott
 Edward Dillon
 Jeanie MacPherson
 Lottie Pickford
 Claire McDowell

See also
 D. W. Griffith filmography

References

External links

The Italian Barber; allrovi.com

1911 films
1911 drama films
Silent American drama films
American silent short films
American black-and-white films
Films directed by D. W. Griffith
Films shot in Fort Lee, New Jersey
Biograph Company films
1911 short films
1910s American films